Marko Mihojević (born 21 April 1996) is a Bosnian professional footballer who plays as a centre-back for 1. Lig club Göztepe and the Bosnia and Herzegovina national team.

Mihojević started his professional career at Leotar, before joining Sarajevo in 2014. Four years later, he moved to PAOK, who loaned him to OFI later that year and to Erzgebirge Aue in 2019. In 2020, he signed with Göztepe.

A former youth international for Bosnia and Herzegovina, Mihojević made his senior international debut in 2018.

Club career

Early career
Mihojević came through youth academy of his hometown club Leotar. He made his professional debut against GOŠK Gabela on 6 October 2012 at the age of 16.

Sarajevo
In July 2014, Mihojević joined Sarajevo on a four-year deal. On 28 February 2015, he made his official debut for the side against Zvijezda Gradačac. He won his first trophy with the club on 30 May, when they were crowned league champions.

In June 2017, Mihojević was named team captain.

On 27 August, he scored his first professional goal against Borac Banja Luka.

In November, he extended his contract until June 2020.

PAOK
In January 2018, Mihojević was transferred to Greek outfit PAOK for an undisclosed fee. On 5 May, he made his competitive debut for the team against Platanias. He won his first title with the club on 12 May, by beating AEK Athens in Greek Cup final.

In August, Mihojević was sent on a season-long loan to OFI.

In July 2019, he was loaned to German side Erzgebirge Aue until the end of season.

Göztepe
In September 2020, Mihojević signed a three-year deal with Turkish outfit Göztepe. He debuted officially for the side against Fenerbahçe on 18 October. On 16 January 2021, he scored his first goal for the team in a triumph over Konyaspor.

Despite Göztepe's relegation to 1. Lig in April 2022, Mihojević decided to stay at the club.

International career
Mihojević represented Bosnia and Herzegovina at all youth levels.

In January 2018, he received his first senior call-up, for friendly games against the United States and Mexico. He debuted against the former on 28 January.

Career statistics

Club

International

Honours
Sarajevo
Bosnian Premier League: 2014–15

PAOK
Greek Cup: 2017–18

References

External links

1996 births
Living people
People from Trebinje
Serbs of Bosnia and Herzegovina
Bosnia and Herzegovina footballers
Bosnia and Herzegovina youth international footballers
Bosnia and Herzegovina under-21 international footballers
Bosnia and Herzegovina international footballers
Bosnia and Herzegovina expatriate footballers
Association football central defenders
FK Leotar players
FK Sarajevo players
PAOK FC players
OFI Crete F.C. players
FC Erzgebirge Aue players
Göztepe S.K. footballers
Premier League of Bosnia and Herzegovina players
Super League Greece players
2. Bundesliga players
Süper Lig players
TFF First League players
Expatriate footballers in Greece
Expatriate footballers in Germany
Expatriate footballers in Turkey
Bosnia and Herzegovina expatriate sportspeople in Greece
Bosnia and Herzegovina expatriate sportspeople in Germany
Bosnia and Herzegovina expatriate sportspeople in Turkey